Adam Greenfield is an American writer and urbanist, based in London. He was born in Philadelphia, Pennsylvania in 1968.

Early life
Greenfield attended New York University, graduating with a degree in Cultural studies in 1989. Between 1995 and 2000, he served as a psychological operations specialist (later sergeant) in the United States Army’s Special Operations Command.

Career
After leaving the Army, Greenfield took up work in the then-nascent field of information architecture for the World Wide Web, holding a succession of positions culminating in employment at the Tokyo office of Razorfish, where he was head of information architecture.

In the 2006 and 2007 academic years, with Kevin Slavin, he co-taught a class at New York University's Interactive Telecommunications Program called Urban Computing. In the following academic year the class was renamed Urban Experience in the Network Age, and Greenfield taught it alone. From 2008 to 2010 he was Nokia's head of design direction for user interface and services, residing in Helsinki throughout the assignment. In 2010 he returned to New York City and founded an urban-systems design practice called Urbanscale, which describes their work as "design for networked cities and citizens." 

In September 2013, Greenfield was awarded the inaugural Senior Urban Fellowship at the LSE Cities centre of the London School of Economics, relocated to London, and taught in the MArch Urban Design programme at the Bartlett School of Architecture of University College London.

Publications
2006: Everyware: The Dawning Age of Ubiquitous Computing, which has been called "groundbreaking" by Bruce Sterling: "One puts it down with a strange conviction that web-designers have transcended geekdom and achieved Zen soulfulness."
2007: Urban Computing and Its Discontents, (co-author) an overview of informatics for urban environments
2013: Against the Smart City.
2017: Radical Technologies (Verso), about the relationship between new technologies and social forces leading to their adoption or rejection. Writing for The Guardian, Stephen Poole called the book "tremendously intelligent and stylish", and comparing Greenfield's view of the future with The Culture novels from Iain M. Banks.

References

External links

Greenfield's personal site
Urbanscale
"Urban Computing and its Discontents", a freely downloadable pamphlet co-authored with Mark Shepard

American technology writers
1968 births
Living people
Writers from Philadelphia
Writers from London
21st-century American non-fiction writers